The small village of Aberbeeg lies in both the county borough of Blaenau Gwent and Caerphilly County Borough Council in Wales, within the historic boundaries of Monmouthshire. It is part of the community of Llanhilleth. The two main tributaries of the Ebbw River, the Ebbw Fawr and Ebbw Fach converge at Aberbeeg.

Nearby are the villages of Llanhilleth and Six Bells, where the former colliery allowed the whole community to thrive as part of the South Wales coalfield community.

Today, one of the most prominent sights in Aberbeeg area is the grade II* listed St. Illtyd's parish church, which is thought to have been built in the late 5th century, and underwent extensive renovation over the last 200 years. After closing in 1962, the church was privately acquired in 1984. It has now returned to public ownership and is now open to visitors. The friends of St. Illtyd help Blaenau Gwent look after the building.

Aberbeeg railway station closed on 30 April 1962. The Ebbw Valley Railway re-opened in February 2008. A bus service between Aberbeeg and Llanhilleth, the nearest railway station on the line, runs every hour.

In popular culture
In the TV series Fresh Meat one of the lead characters, Josie (Kimberley Nixon), states she is from Aberbeeg.

Notes

Bibliography

External links 

Photos of Aberbeeg and surrounding area on geograph.org.uk
Welsh Coal Mines website

Villages in Blaenau Gwent